A necklet is a type of decoration which is designed to be worn and displayed around a person's neck, rather than hung (draped) from the chest as is the standard practice for displaying most decorations.

In the Middle Ages most order's insignias were worn on a collar – see livery collar. Later, in the 16th century the insignia of the French Order of the Holy Spirit were worn on a ribbon. When, in the late 17th century, orders were divided into several classes, the cross on a ribbon around the neck became the privilege of a commander. A decoration in that rank is usually awarded to high-ranking officials like brigadiers, consuls and secretaries of State.

A female usually wears her commander's cross on a bow on the shoulder of her dress.

In chivalric orders like the Order of Malta or the Teutonic Order the insignia of the knights is worn hanging from a ribbon around the neck. The same is true of the Order of the Golden Fleece.

In the 19th century it was not unusual to wear a Grand Cross, normally hanging from a ribbon over the shoulder to the hip as on a necklet when this was considered more convenient or when another Grand Cross was worn.

Select list of badges suspended from neck riband
Some nations confer honors which are signified in the form of a badge which is worn suspended from a ribbon (also known as riband or ribband) around the neck, including:

See also
 Order
 Order of chivalry
 Order of merit
 Collar (order)

Notes

References
 Duckers, Peter. (2004). British orders and decorations. Princes Risborough : Shire. ; 
 Paul Hieronymussen, Paul and Christine Crowley. (1967). Orders, medals and decorations of Britain and Europe. London: Blandford Press. 
 McCreery, Christopher. 2005). The Order of Canada: Its Origins, History and Development. Toronto: University of Toronto Press. ; 
 Peterson, James W., Barry C. Weaver and Michael A. Quigley. (2001). Orders and Medals of Japan and Associated States. San Ramon, California: Orders and Medals Society of America. ;

External links
 Collars of Orders of Knighthood and Livery Collars

Award items
Neckwear
Medals
Sashes